A board game record is a game record for a board game.

Kifu (棋譜) is the Japanese term for an abstract strategy game record. In China, people named this kind of record "qipu" (. In Korea, people named this kind of record "Gibo".

In go, board game records are traditionally used to record games on a grid diagram, marking the plays on the points and pieces.

Board game record databases can be useful to study board games. Many AI algorithms review a large database of professional games.

See also 

 Go game record
 Shogi notation

Game databases
Shogi theory